Katherine Chang (born May 3, 1995) is an American actress. She is known for her roles as Rebecca Ahn in The Bling Ring (2013), Ellen Reeves in A Birder's Guide to Everything (2013) and Claire Connors in The Outcasts (2017).

Early life
Chang was born in Chicago, Illinois and raised in Winnetka, Illinois. Her paternal grandfather was of Korean descent, while the rest of her ancestry is Irish and German. She was trained at the Wilmette Theatre's Actors Training Center. Chang attended New Trier High School, graduating in 2013. She started studying creative writing at Columbia University. In 2015, she transferred to Northwestern University. Chang graduated from Northwestern in 2017 with a degree in screenwriting.

Career
In 2013, Chang earned praise for her portrayal of Rebecca Ahn, the leader of the title group in the satirical crime film The Bling Ring. Rolling Stone described her as "mesmerizing" while the Chicago Tribune called her a "performer of serious promise". The Hollywood Reporter said Chang's performance marked her as "someone to watch" going forward in her career. Director Sofia Coppola explained her choice of casting such a "fresh face" in a lead role, saying, "There's sort of a naturalness, as opposed to having worked a lot, being kid actors." Also in 2013, Chang starred in the comedy film A Birder's Guide to Everything. She then had a supporting role in the independent drama film Anesthesia. Chang then appeared in the teen comedy film The Outcasts, and will star in the upcoming Canal Street and All The Little Things We Kill.

Filmography

Film

Television

Producer

References

External links
 

1995 births
21st-century American actresses
Actresses from Chicago
American film actresses
American actresses of Korean descent
American people of German descent
American people of Irish descent
Living people
New Trier High School alumni
People from Chicago
People from Winnetka, Illinois
Columbia College (New York) alumni
Northwestern University alumni